The canton of Aigues-Mortes is an administrative division of the Gard department, southern France. Its borders were modified at the French canton reorganisation which came into effect in March 2015. Its seat is in Aigues-Mortes.

Communes 
The canton of Aigues-Mortes consists of seven communes:
Aigues-Mortes
Aimargues
Aubais
Le Cailar
Gallargues-le-Montueux
Le Grau-du-Roi
Saint-Laurent-d'Aigouze

References

Cantons of Gard